Desperadas is a 2007 Filipino romantic comedy film written by Roy Iglesias, directed by Joel Lamangan, and starring Marian Rivera, Ruffa Gutierrez, Rufa Mae Quinto and Iza Calzado.  The film was followed by the sequel Desperadas 2 in 2008.

Plot
Four siblings from different men are living on a compound. They have different stories and problems to face.
The eldest daughter (Iza Calzado) tries to spice up her marriage with her workaholic husband.
The second daughter (Ruffa Gutierrez) is a spendthrift woman, and a single mother who struggles with dating.
The third daughter (Rufa Mae Quinto) is a professional sexual and clinical psychologist obsessed who suspects that her husband is gay.
The youngest (Marian Rivera) is a childish and wild woman, engaged in her conservative boyfriend who came from a religious family.

Cast

 Ruffa Gutierrez as Isabella Verona
 Rufa Mae Quinto as Dr. Patricia Llanes-Quinto, PhD
 Iza Calzado as Atty. Stephanie Ocampo-Arribe
 Marian Rivera as Courtney Vallarda-Reyes
 Wendell Ramos as Dave Quinto
 Jay-R as Vito
 TJ Trinidad as Dr. Richard Arribe
 Luis Alandy as Mandy
 Ryan Eigenmann as Atty. James LaMadrid
 Will Devaughn as Patrick Reyes
 Nova Villa as Margot Solis de Llanes Ocampo Verona Vallarda Manalo
 Gina Alajar as Patrick's mother
 Tirso Cruz III as Patrick's father
 Charlie Davao as Courtney's father
 Ambet Nabus as Alexis' class adviser

Recognition

Awards and nominations
 2007, won Festival Prize for 'Best Make-Up Artist' at Metro Manila Film Festival
 2007, won 'Gender Sensitive Award' at Metro Manila Film Festival

References

External links
 Desperadas at the Internet Movie Database
  as archived January 23, 2010

2007 films
2007 romantic comedy-drama films
Regal Entertainment films
Filipino-language films
2000s Tagalog-language films
Philippine romantic comedy-drama films
2007 drama films
Films directed by Joel Lamangan